Felipe Iturriaga Esquivel (December 7, 1899 – September 2, 1977) was a Chilean farmer and politician, Mayor of Pichilemu from 1932 to 1935, 1941–1944 and 1956–1960.

Biography 
Iturriaga was born in Colchagua on December 7, 1899. He was baptized in Ciruelos Parish, where he lived for most of his life.

Iturriaga married Olga Maturana (1906–1973), and they had 5 children: Arturo Iturriaga; María Mercedes Iturriaga; Carlos Iturriaga; Olga Iturriaga; and Rodolfo Iturriaga.

Iturriaga died in Santiago, Chile on September 2, 1977.

Iturriaga was a member of the Conservative Party of Chile.

References 

1899 births
1977 deaths
People from Colchagua Province
Mayors of Pichilemu
Chilean people of Basque descent
Conservative Party (Chile) politicians